Rama Rajamouli is an Indian costume designer and film stylist, who primarily works in Telugu cinema. Rama made her debut with the 2001 film Student No: 1. She is known for her work in the films Magadheera (2009), Eega (2012), Baahubali: The Beginning (2015), Baahubali 2: The Conclusion (2017) and RRR (2022). 

She is a three-time Nandi Award winner for Best Costume Designer. She was nominated along with Prashanti Tipirneni for Best Costume Design at the 42nd Saturn Awards and at the 12th Asian Film Awards for Baahubali 1 and Baahubali 2.

She is married to filmmaker S. S. Rajamouli.

Personal life 
Rama married filmmaker S. S. Rajamouli in 2001, after the divorce of her previous marriage. Rajamouli calls her Chinni. Rajamouli adopted Karthikeya, Rama's son from her previous marriage. The couple also has an adopted daughter Mayookha. Karthikeya is married to Pooja Prasad, niece of actor Jagapathi Babu. Filmmaker Gunnam Gangaraju is her cousin.

Career 
Initially Rama entered the industry in 2001 as an actor by doing various small roles in the TV sitcom Amrutham, created and produced by her cousin Gangaraju Gunnam.

After marrying S. S. Rajamouli, she started her career as a costume designer with the film Student No. 1 (2001). Rama regularly works in her husband films as a costume designer and stylist. In an interview to TV9, Rama said that Amar Chitra Katha is her inspiration for costume designing in Baahubali. For the film RRR, Rama worked as an additional dialogue writer.

Filmography

As a costume designer and stylist

As actress

Awards and nominations

References 

Indian costume designers
Living people
Artists from Andhra Pradesh
Film people from Andhra Pradesh
Nandi Award winners
Actresses in Telugu television
Telugu actresses
Indian television actresses
1968 births